Zuki Lee (born 26 September 1977) is a Hong Kong actress.

Lee is noted for her roles as Qian Meimei and Shu Qing in the television series Flaming Butterfly (2007) and Mr. and Mrs. Gambler (2012) respectively.

Life
Lee was born and raised in Hong Kong. She enrolled at the TVB's acting classes, where she studied alongside Damon Law Kwun Fung, Lo Hing-Fai Marco, and LuLu Kai.

In 2012, Lee signed with Wang Ziqi Studio.

Personal life
Lee dated Eric Li when she studied at TVB's acting classes.

Filmography

Film

Television

References

External links

1977 births
Living people
Hong Kong television actresses
Hong Kong film actresses